Samuel Allen Counter Jr. (July 8, 1944 – July 12, 2017) was a professor of neurology at Harvard Medical School and inaugural director of the Harvard Foundation for Intercultural and Race Relations.

Early life
Samuel Allen Counter Jr. was born in Americus, Georgia. His mother, Anne (née Johnson), was a nurse and his father managed businesses, but died prematurely of a heart attack. Counter grew up in south Florida in the segregated town of Boynton Beach and attended his first civil rights protest as the youngest participant at a "swim-in" at a white-only beach.

Counter studied biology and sensory physiology as an undergraduate at Tennessee State University, then earned his doctorate in electrophysiology from Case Western University. He later earned a PhD from the Karolinska Institute in Sweden.

Career
Counter joined the Harvard faculty in 1970, first serving as a postdoctoral fellow and assistant neurophysiologist at Harvard Medical School and Massachusetts General Hospital. As a neuroscientist, his research focused on nerve, muscle and auditory physiology as well as diagnosis of brain injury. In 1970, the U.S. Secretary of Health, Education and Welfare named Counter to National Institute of Mental Health's National Advisory Mental Health Council.

In 1981 Counter worked with Harvard President Derek Bok, Dean Henry Rosovsky, and Reverend Peter Gomes to create the Harvard Foundation for Intercultural and Race Relations, for which Counter became the founding director. He remained director until his death in 2017.

In addition to his work at Harvard, Counter was also adjunct professor of neuroscience at the Karolinska Institute in Stockholm, and served as Consul General of Sweden in Boston and New England.

Counter was also known for his achievements as an explorer. In 1971, he located a group of people living in the rain forest in northern Brazil, Suriname and French Guiana; the group was descended from African slaves. Suriname was long inhabited by various indigenous people before being invaded and contested by European powers from the 16th century, eventually coming under Dutch rule in the late 17th century. As the chief sugar colony during the Dutch colonial period, it was primarily a plantation economy dependent on African slaves and, following the abolition of slavery in 1863, indentured servants from Asia. Suriname was ruled by the Dutch-chartered company Society of Suriname between 1683 and 1795. In 1986, Counter located the Eskimo descendants of earlier U.S. explorers of the arctic, Matthew A. Henson and Robert E. Peary. Counter was elected to The Explorers Club in 1989.

Counter designed Arthur Ashe's memorial at Woodland Cemetery in Richmond, Virginia, dedicated on what would have been Ashe's 50th birthday on July 10, 1993.

Awards and honors
In 2012, Counter was knighted by Carl XVI Gustaf, King of Sweden.

In 2013, Counter was awarded the Explorers Club's Lowell Thomas Award, recognizing "the principle of just dealing and right action in field exploration."

Works
 I Sought My Brother: An Afro-American Reunion with David L. Evans (MIT Press, 1981; accompaniment to 1978 PBS special by Evans and Allen)
North Pole Legacy: Black, White and Eskimo (University of Massachusetts Press, 1991)
North Pole Promise: Black, White, and Inuit Friends (Bauhan Publishing, Peterborough, NH, 2017 $19.95 (144p) )

References

External links
 
 

1944 births
2017 deaths
African-American scientists
American neuroscientists
American polar explorers
Case Western Reserve University alumni
Harvard University administrators
Harvard Medical School faculty
Academic staff of the Karolinska Institute
People from Americus, Georgia
People from Boynton Beach, Florida
Tennessee State University alumni
20th-century African-American people
21st-century African-American people